Keesja Gofers (born 16 March 1990) is an Australian water polo player.

Gofers won the silver medal at the 2013 World Aquatics Championships in Barcelona, Spain, and the bronze medal at the 2019 World Aquatics Championships in Gwangju, South Korea.

She competed at the 2016 Summer Olympics.

Gofers was a member of the Australian Stingrays squad that competed at the Tokyo 2020 Olympics. The head coach was Predrag Mihailović. By finishing second in their pool, the Aussie Stingers went through to the quarterfinals. They were beaten 8-9 by Russia and therefore did not compete for an Olympic medal. Australia at the 2020 Summer Olympics details the team's performance in depth.

Personal life
Keesja Gofers is the sister of Australian Water Polo player Taniele Gofers and Australian Handball player Allira Hudson-Gofers.

See also
 List of World Aquatics Championships medalists in water polo

References

External links
 

1990 births
Living people
Place of birth missing (living people)
Australian female water polo players
Olympic water polo players of Australia
Water polo players at the 2016 Summer Olympics
Olympiacos Women's Water Polo Team players
Water polo players at the 2020 Summer Olympics
21st-century Australian women
20th-century Australian women